Layne McDowell (born August 12, 1949) is a Canadian football player who played professionally for the BC Lions.

References

1949 births
Living people
BC Lions players
Iowa Hawkeyes football players